Eric Howard Carmen (born August 11, 1949) is an American singer, songwriter, guitarist, and keyboardist. He was first known as the lead vocalist of the Raspberries. He had numerous hit songs in the 1970s and 1980s, first as a member of the Raspberries (who had a million-selling single with "Go All the Way"), and then with his solo career, including hits such as "All by Myself", "Never Gonna Fall in Love Again", "She Did It", "Hungry Eyes", and "Make Me Lose Control".

Early life
From a family of Russian Jewish immigrants, Carmen was born in Cleveland, Ohio, United States, and grew up in Lyndhurst, Ohio. He has been involved with music since early childhood. By the age of two, he was entertaining his parents with impressions of Jimmy Durante and Johnnie Ray. By age three, he was in the Dalcroze Eurhythmics program at the Cleveland Institute of Music. At six years old, he took violin lessons from his aunt Muriel Carmen, who was a violinist in the Cleveland Orchestra. By age 11, he was playing piano and dreaming about writing his own songs. The arrival of the Beatles and the Rolling Stones altered his dream slightly. By the time he was a sophomore at Charles F. Brush High School, Carmen was playing piano and singing in rock bands including the Fugitives, the Harlequins, the Sounds of Silence, and the Cyrus Erie.

Though classically trained in piano, Carmen became a self-taught guitarist. At 15, he started guitar lessons, but when his teacher's approach did not fit with what he wanted, he decided to teach himself. He bought a Beatles chord book and studied guitar for the next four months.

Tenure with The Raspberries
Carmen became serious about being a musician while attending John Carroll University. He joined a band named Cyrus Erie, which recorded several commercially unsuccessful singles for Epic Records. Cyrus Erie guitarist Wally Bryson had been playing with friends Jim Bonfanti and Dave Smalley in one of Cleveland's most popular bands, the Choir, which scored a minor national hit in 1967 with the single "It's Cold Outside".

When Cyrus Erie and the Choir disbanded at the end of the 1960s, Carmen, Bryson, Bonfanti, and Smalley teamed up to form Raspberries, a rock and roll band that was among the chief exponents of the early 1970s power pop style. Carmen was the lead singer of the group, and wrote or co-wrote all their hit songs.  In 1975, after the breakup of Raspberries, he started his solo career, de-emphasizing harder rock elements in favor of soft rock and power ballads.

In 2004, Carmen, along with original Raspberries members Jim Bonfanti, Wally Bryson, and Dave Smalley, re-formed the band for a series of sold-out live performances in cities across the United States. On that tour, the Raspberries recorded a live album of their hits at The House of Blues on Sunset Strip, in Hollywood. Both the show and album received critical acclaim. Carmen himself has stated that he planned to write new harder-edged songs for the band to perform in the same vein as those that the Raspberries performed in the 1970s.

Solo career
Carmen's first two solo singles were chart hits in 1976. Both were built around themes by Sergei Rachmaninoff. The first of these singles, "All by Myself" – based on Rachmaninoff's Piano Concerto No. 2 – hit number 2 in the United States, and number 12 in the United Kingdom where it was his only charting hit. It sold over one million copies, and was awarded a gold disc by the R.I.A.A. in April 1976. The follow-up single, "Never Gonna Fall in Love Again" – based on the main theme of the third movement of Rachmaninoff's Symphony No. 2 – reached number 11 on the Billboard Hot 100, and hit number one on the US Adult Contemporary Chart, as well as number nine on the Cash Box chart. In the UK, Dana took it to number 31 and in Australia Mark Holden took it to number 13. Those songs featured on his 1975 self-titled debut album, along with "That's Rock and Roll", a number 3 hit single for singer Shaun Cassidy. The album made number 21 on the Billboard album chart and was certified gold in 1977 for sales of more than 500,000 copies.

Carmen's second album, Boats Against the Current, came out in the summer of 1977 and received mixed reviews. It featured backup players such as Burton Cummings, Andrew Gold, Bruce Johnston and Nigel Olsson. The album spent 13 weeks in the Billboard Album chart, peaking number 45. It also produced the Top 20 single "She Did It", but the title track only managed to scrape the bottom of the chart. The title track was later covered by Olivia Newton-John on her album Totally Hot. A third single taken from the album, "Marathon Man", became his first solo single not to hit the Billboard Hot 100 chart. However, Shaun Cassidy again made the Top 10 in 1978 with Carmen's "Hey Deanie".  For several weeks in the fall of 1977, Carmen had three compositions charting concurrently on the Billboard Hot 100, Cassidy's two big hits and Carmen's own "She Did It".

Carmen followed up with two more albums. Despite declining chart fortunes, the single "Change of Heart" broke into the Pop Top 20, and reached number 6 at AC in late 1978, with this hit also being covered by Samantha Sang on her Emotion LP, but in 1980, after the release of the album "Tonight You're Mine" and single "It Hurts Too Much" (number 75 Billboard Top 100) he temporarily withdrew from the music industry.

Four years later, Carmen resurfaced on Geffen Records in 1985 with a second self-titled album and a sizeable comeback hit "I Wanna Hear It from Your Lips". The single hit the Adult Contemporary Top 10 as well as the Pop Top 40. The follow-up single, "I'm Through with Love", also climbed the Billboard Hot 100 and reached the Top 20 of the Adult Contemporary chart. Another track from the album, "Maybe My Baby", later became a Country hit for Louise Mandrell reaching number 8 on Billboard's Hot Country Songs chart. "I Wanna Hear It from Your Lips" was also covered by Mandrell only managing to peak at 35 on the same chart.
In 1987, Carmen's contribution to the hit movie Dirty Dancing, "Hungry Eyes", hit number 2 on the Adult Contemporary Chart and also returned him to the Pop Top 10. "Reason To Try", a further contribution to the One Moment in Time compilation album of songs recorded for the Seoul Summer Olympics, kept Carmen's profile high in 1988, during which the nostalgic "Make Me Lose Control" also returned him to the number one position on the Adult Contemporary chart – where it stayed for three straight weeks – as well as number 3 on Billboard's Hot 100.

The year 2000 saw the stateside release of I Was Born to Love You, which had been released in 1998 only in Japan as Winter Dreams. Carmen eschewed the use of a band on the recording, playing most of the instruments and programming the drum parts himself. The album did not find a large audience, but Carmen has continued to enjoy success placing songs with other artists over the years. In 2000, he toured with Ringo Starr and His All Starr Band.

On December 24, 2013, the first new recording in over 15 years by Carmen titled "Brand New Year" was released. The track, written and recorded in November/December 2013 in Ohio and Los Angeles, was issued via a gratis download by Legacy Recordings as a special "Christmas gift", to herald the March 2014 arrival of a 30 track career retrospective entitled The Essential Eric Carmen..

Personal life
Carmen moved from Los Angeles back to Gates Mills in northeast Ohio in the 1990s. In 2016, Carmen married former newscaster Amy Murphy.

Discography

Studio albums

Compilation albums

Charted singles

Notes

References

External links
 
 

1949 births
Living people
Musicians from Cleveland
American male singer-songwriters
American pop rock singers
American rock songwriters
American soft rock musicians
American people of Austrian-Jewish descent
Jewish American songwriters
John Carroll University alumni
Singer-songwriters from Ohio
American rock guitarists
American male guitarists
American pop guitarists
American rock keyboardists
Guitarists from Ohio
20th-century American singers
21st-century American singers
20th-century American guitarists
People from Lyndhurst, Ohio
People from Gates Mills, Ohio
Ballad musicians
20th-century American male singers
21st-century American male singers
20th-century American keyboardists
Ringo Starr & His All-Starr Band members